Cornelius Van de Ven (June 16, 1865 – May 8, 1932) was a Dutch-born American prelate of the Catholic Church. He served as the fourth Bishop of Alexandria in Louisiana from 1910 until his death in 1932.  He previously served as bishop of the Diocese of Natchitoches in Louisiana from 1904 until its dissolution in 1910.

Biography

Early life
Cornelius Van de Ven was born on June 16, 1865 in Oirschot, in the southern Netherlands, to Peter Van de Ven and Joanna Maria Roche. After receiving his early education in Sint-Michielsgestel, he began his studies for the priesthood and attended the diocesan seminary in Haaren. While still a seminarian, Van de Ven accepted an appeal from Archbishop Francis Janssens of New Orleans for missionaries in the United States. His uncle, Rev. Cornelius J. Roche, had already immigrated and served as pastor in Michigan.

Priesthood
Van de Ven was ordained a priest on May 31, 1890 by Adrianus Godschalk, the bishop of 's-Hertogenbosch. He departed from Antwerp five months later and arrived in New York City in November 1890. He made his way to Louisiana, where he was immediately appointed assistant pastor of St. Peter's Parish in New Iberia.

Van de Venserved as the founding pastor of Our Lady Help of Christians Church in Jennings, Louisiana (1891-92) before spending a decade at Immaculate Conception Parish in Lake Charles, Louisiana (1892-1902). From 1902 to 1904, he was pastor of St. Joseph's Parish in Baton Rouge, Louisiana.

Bishop of Natchitoches
On August 10, 1904, Van de Ven was appointed to succeed the late Bishop Anthony Durier as bishop of the Diocese of Natchitoches by Pope Pius X. He received his episcopal consecration on November 30, 1904, from Archbishop Placide Chapelle, with Bishops Thomas Heslin and Gustave Rouxel serving as co-consecrators, at St. Louis Cathedral in New Orleans. At 39, Van de Ven was one of the youngest Catholic bishops in the country.

Bishop of Alexandria 
The most important act of Van de Ven's administration was transferring the seat of the diocese from Natchitoches to Alexandria, a railroad town with a large Catholic population. The diocese was renamed the Diocese of Alexandria on August 6, 1910, and St. Francis Xavier Church was designated as the new cathedral. Van de Ven recruited the Sisters of Charity of the Incarnate Word to the diocese, where they established North Louisiana's first Catholic hospital (Schumpert Medical Center in Shreveport) and St. Joseph's orphanage. He promoted lay organizations and served as state chaplain of the Knights of Columbus. During his tenure, new churches and parochial schools were established for African-American Catholics in Marksville and Mansura, Louisiana. In 1929, he was named an assistant to the papal throne by Pope Pius XI.

Cornelius Van de Ven died on May 8, 1932, at Schumpert Medical Center in Shreveport, at age 66.

Notes

1865 births
1932 deaths
Ven, Cornelius
Dutch emigrants to the United States
Roman Catholic bishops of Alexandria
20th-century Roman Catholic bishops in the United States